François Nicoullaud (24 July 1940 – 20 March 2021) was a French diplomat and political analyst.

Biography
Nicoullaud graduated from Sciences Po in 1961 and began working for the Ministry of Europe and Foreign Affairs. He then studied at the École nationale d'administration from 1970 to 1973. From 1964 to 2005, he served several diplomatic roles. He served as Second Secretary of the Embassy of France in Chile from 1973 to 1975 and was chief of staff of the French military governor general of Berlin from 1975 to 1978.

Alongside his diplomatic career, Nicoullaud chaired the board of directors of the Agency for French Education Abroad and the French Development Agency. He was one of the first chairmen of the association CFDT des Affaires étrangères. In 1985, he was one of the authors of "Manifeste pour un ministère des relations extérieures moderne et démocratique". He was an active member of the ADFE-Français du Monde, of which he served as president from 2005 to 2009. From 2005 to 2013, he served on the Assembly of French Citizens Abroad. From 2014 to 2018, he taught at Sciences Po's Paris School of International Affairs. He published a number of articles on Iran and its environment.

François Nicoullaud died in Paris on 20 March 2021, at the age of 80.

Publications
Le Turban et la Rose, journal inattendu d'un ambassadeur en Iran (2006)

References

1940 births
2021 deaths
French diplomats
Ambassadors of France to Iran
Ambassadors of France to Hungary
People from Suez